In Greek mythology, Triptolemus  (Triptólemos, lit. "threefold warrior"; also known as Buzyges) is a figure connected with the goddess Demeter of the Eleusinian Mysteries. He was either a mortal prince, the eldest son of King Celeus of Eleusis, or, according to Pseudo-Apollodorus' Bibliotheca (I.V.2), the son of Gaia and Oceanus.

Mythology

Persephone's abduction 
While Demeter (in the guise of an old woman named Doso) was searching for her daughter Persephone (Kore), who had been abducted by Hades, she received a hospitable welcome from Celeus. He asked her to nurse Demophon—"killer of men", a counterpart to Triptolemus— and Triptolemus, his sons by Metanira. Demeter saw Triptolemus was sick and fed him her breast milk. Not only did he recover his strength but he instantly became an adult. As another gift to Celeus, in gratitude for his hospitality, Demeter secretly planned to make Demophon immortal by burning away his mortal spirit in the family hearth every night. She was unable to complete the ritual because Metanira walked in on her one night. Instead, Demeter chose to teach Triptolemus the art of agriculture and, from him, the rest of Greece learned to plant and reap crops.  He flew across the land on a chariot drawn by dragons while Demeter and Persephone, once restored to her mother, cared for him, and helped him complete his mission of educating the whole of Greece in the art of agriculture. Triptolemus was equally associated with the bestowal of hope for the afterlife associated with the expansion of the Eleusinian Mysteries (Kerenyi 1967 p 123).

Adventures of the hero 
When Triptolemus taught King Lyncus of the Scythians, the arts of agriculture, Lyncus refused to teach it to his people and then tried to murder Triptolemus. As punishment, Demeter turned Lyncus into a lynx. King Charnabon of the Getae also made an attempt on Triptolemus' life, killing one of his dragons to prevent his escape. Demeter intervened again, replacing the dragon and condemning Charnabon to a life of torment. Upon his death, Charnabon was placed in the stars as the constellation Ophiuchus, said to resemble a man trying to kill a serpent, as a warning to mortals who would think to betray those favoured by the gods.

Eleusinian Mysteries 
In the archaic Homeric Hymn to Demeter, Triptolemus is briefly mentioned as one of the original priests of Demeter, one of the first men to learn the secret rites and mysteries of Eleusinian Mysteries: Diocles, Eumolpos, Celeus and Polyxeinus were the others mentioned of the first priests. The role of Triptolemus in the Eleusinian mysteries was exactly defined: "he had a cult of his own, apart from the Mysteries. One entered his temple on the way to the closed-off sacred precinct, before coming to the former Hekataion, the temple of Artemis outside the great Propylaia." (Kerenyi).  In the 5th-century bas-relief in the National Museum, Athens (illustration), which probably came from his temple, the boy Triptolemus stands between the two Goddesses, Demeter and the Kore, and receives from Demeter the ear of grain (of gold, now lost).

Porphyry (On Abstinence IV.22) ascribes to Triptolemus three commandments for a simple, pious life: "Honor your parents", "Honor the gods with fruits"—for the Greeks, "fruits" would include the grain—and "Spare the animals" (Kerenyi, p128).

Triptolemus is also depicted as a young man with a branch or diadem placed in his hair, usually sitting on his chariot, adorned with serpents.  His attributes include a plate of grain, a pair of wheat or barley ears and a scepter.

Celeus or the peasant Dysaules may be substituted for Triptolemus as the primordial Eleusinian recipient of the first gifts of the Mysteries.

See also

Indra

References  

Kerenyi, Karl, 1967. "Eleusis: Archetypal Image of Mother and Daughter (Princeton:Bollingen Series LXV.4)

Greek mythological heroes
Chthonic beings
Children of Gaia
Children of Oceanus
Demigods in classical mythology
Consorts of Demeter
Princes in Greek mythology
Eleusinian characters in Greek mythology
Deeds of Demeter